Cornelia Frances Jefferson ( Cornelia Frances Thomas; 1 October 1796 in New York – 24 October 1848 in Philadelphia) was an early-American singer and prolific comic actress.  She was known widely in her younger years as Mrs. Burke, which was the surname from her first marriage to Thomas Burke.

Life 
Cornelia’s mother died when she was very young. Her father, who had been raised in affluence, lost everything and was very poor. He finally found employment in the service of Alexander Placide, in the Charleston Theatre in Charleston, South Carolina.

Career
Cornelia was trained in the Charleston Theatre in acting and singing. She was engaged at the Charleston Theatre as an actress and a singer.

According to Ireland:
 "she possessed a fair share of ability as a comic actress, with a pleasing face and person, and an exquisite voice which, in power, sweetness and purity, was unapproached by anybody."

Marriages 
In 1816, she married Thomas Burke (1794–1825), an Irish comedian.  She and Thomas had one son, Charles Saint Thomas Burke (1822–1854), deriving the name of "Saint" from his godfather.  He was known in his early days as "Master Burke."
Then, on July 27, 1826, in Philadelphia, she married Joseph Jefferson II (1804–1842).  She and Joseph had four children.  Two died at a very early age, the other two were Joseph Jefferson (1829–1905), who become a noted actor, and Cornelia (1935–1899).

References 

1796 births
1849 deaths
19th-century American women singers
19th-century American singers
19th-century American actresses
American stage actresses